Photoexcitation is the production of an excited state of a quantum system by photon absorption. The excited state originates from the interaction between a photon and the quantum system. Photons carry energy that is determined by the wavelengths of the light that carries the photons. Objects that emit light with longer wavelengths, emit photons carrying less energy. In contrast to that, light with shorter wavelengths emit photons with more energy. When the photon interacts with a quantum system, it is therefore important to know what wavelength one is dealing with. A shorter wavelength will transfer more energy to the quantum system than longer wavelengths.

On the atomic and molecular scale photoexcitation is the photoelectrochemical process of electron excitation by photon absorption, when the energy of the photon is too low to cause photoionization. The absorption of the photon takes place in accordance with Planck's quantum theory.

Photoexcitation plays a role in photoisomerization and is exploited in different techniques:
Dye-sensitized solar cells makes use of photoexcitation by exploiting it in cheaper inexpensive mass production solar cells. The solar cells rely on a large surface area in order to catch and absorb as many high energy photons as possible. Shorter wavelengths are more efficient for the energy conversion compared to longer wavelengths, since shorter wavelengths carry photons that are more energy rich. Light containing shorter wavelengths therefore cause a longer and less efficient conversion of energy in dye-sensitized solar cells.
Photochemistry
Luminescence
Optically pumped lasers use photoexcitation in a way that the excited atoms in the lasers get an enormous direct-gap gain needed for the lasers. The density that is needed for the population inversion in the compound Ge, a material often used in lasers, must become 1020 cm−3, and this is acquired via photoexcitation. The photoexcitation causes the electrons in atoms to go to an excited state. The moment the amount of atoms in the excited state is higher than the amount in the normal ground state, the population inversion occurs. The inversion, like the one caused with germanium, makes it possible for materials to act as lasers.
Photochromic applications. Photochromism causes a transformation of two forms of a molecule by absorbing a photon. For example the BIPS molecule(2H-l-benzopyran-2,2-indolines) can convert from trans to cis and back by absorbing a photon. The different forms are associated with different absorption bands. In a cis-form of BIPS, the transient absorption band has a value of 21050 cm−1, in contrast to the band from the trans-form, that has a value of 16950 cm−1. The results were optically visible, where the BIPS in gels turned from a colorless appearance to a brown or pink color after repeatedly being exposed to a high energy UV pump beam. High energy photons cause a transformation in the BIPS molecule making the molecule change its structure.

On the nuclear scale photoexcitation includes the production of nucleon and delta baryon resonances in nuclei.

References

Photochemistry
Physical chemistry
Time-resolved spectroscopy